Harry Dean Stanton (July 14, 1926 – September 15, 2017) was an American actor, musician, and singer.
In a career that spanned more than six decades, Stanton played supporting roles in films including Cool Hand Luke (1967), Kelly's Heroes (1970), Dillinger (1973), The Godfather Part II (1974), Alien (1979), Escape from New York (1981), Christine (1983), Repo Man (1984), One Magic Christmas (1985), Pretty in Pink (1986), The Last Temptation of Christ (1988), Wild at Heart (1990), The Straight Story (1999), The Green Mile (1999), The Man Who Cried (2000),  Alpha Dog (2006) and Inland Empire (2006). He had rare lead roles in Wim Wenders' Paris, Texas (1984) and in Lucky (2017).

Early life
Stanton was born in West Irvine, Kentucky, to Sheridan Harry Stanton, a tobacco farmer and barber, and Ersel (née Moberly), a cook. His parents divorced when Stanton was in high school; both later remarried.

Stanton had two younger brothers and a younger half-brother. His family had a musical background. Stanton attended Lafayette High School and the University of Kentucky in Lexington where he performed at the Guignol Theatre under the direction of British theater director Wallace Briggs, and studied journalism and radio arts. "I could have been a writer," he told an interviewer for a 2011 documentary, Harry Dean Stanton: Crossing Mulholland, in which he sings and plays the harmonica. "I had to decide if I wanted to be a singer or an actor. I was always singing. I thought if I could be an actor, I could do all of it." Briggs encouraged him to leave the university and become an actor. He studied at the Pasadena Playhouse in Pasadena, California, where his classmates included his friends Tyler MacDuff and Dana Andrews.

During World War II, Stanton served in the United States Navy, including a stint as a cook aboard the USS LST-970, a tank landing ship, during the Battle of Okinawa.

Career
Stanton appeared in indie and cult films (Two-Lane Blacktop, Cockfighter, Escape from New York, Repo Man) as well as mainstream Hollywood productions, including Cool Hand Luke, The Godfather Part II, Alien, Red Dawn, Alpha Dog, Pretty in Pink, Stephen King's Christine, and The Green Mile. He was a favorite actor of the directors Sam Peckinpah, John Milius, David Lynch, and Monte Hellman, and was also close friends with Francis Ford Coppola and Jack Nicholson. He was best man at Nicholson's wedding in 1962.

He made his first television appearance in 1954 in Inner Sanctum. He played Stoneman in the Have Gun – Will Travel 1959 episode "Treasure Trail", credited under Dean Stanton. He made his film debut in 1957 in the Western Tomahawk Trail. He appeared (uncredited) as a complaining BAR man at the beginning of the 1959 film Pork Chop Hill starring Gregory Peck. Then in 1962, he had a very small part in How the West Was Won, portraying one of Charlie Gant's (Eli Wallach) gang. The following year he had a minor role as a poetry-reciting beatnik in The Man from the Diner's Club. Early in his career, he took the name Dean Stanton to avoid confusion with the actor Harry Stanton.

His breakthrough part came with the lead role in Wim Wenders' Paris, Texas. Playwright Sam Shepard, who wrote the film's script, had spotted Stanton at a bar in Santa Fe, New Mexico in 1983 while both were attending a film festival in that city. The two fell into conversation. "I was telling him I was sick of the roles I was playing," Stanton recalled in a 1986 interview. "I told him I wanted to play something of some beauty or sensitivity. I had no inkling he was considering me for the lead in his movie." Not long afterward, Shepard phoned him in Los Angeles to offer Stanton the part of the protagonist, Travis, "a role that called for the actor to remain largely silent ... as a lost, broken soul trying to put his life back together and reunite with his estranged family after having vanished years earlier."

Stanton was a favorite of film critic Roger Ebert, who said that "no movie featuring either Harry Dean Stanton or M. Emmet Walsh in a supporting role can be altogether bad." However, Ebert later admitted that Dream a Little Dream (1989), in which Stanton appeared, was a "clear violation" of this rule.

He had eight appearances between 1958 and 1968 on Gunsmoke, four on the network's Rawhide, three on The Untouchables, two on Bonanza, and an episode of The Rifleman. He later had a cameo in Two and a Half Men (having previously appeared with Jon Cryer in Pretty in Pink and with Charlie Sheen in Red Dawn). Beginning in 2006, Stanton featured as Roman Grant, the manipulative leader/prophet of a polygamous sect on the HBO television series Big Love.

Stanton also occasionally toured nightclubs as a singer and guitarist, playing mostly country-inflected cover tunes. He appeared in the Dwight Yoakam music video for "Sorry You Asked", portrayed a cantina owner in a Ry Cooder video for "Get Rhythm", and participated in the video for Bob Dylan's "Dreamin' of You". He worked with a number of musical artists, Dylan, Art Garfunkel, and Kris Kristofferson among them, and played harmonica on The Call's 1989 album Let the Day Begin.

In 2010, Stanton appeared in an episode of the TV series Chuck, reprising his role in the 1984 film Repo Man. In 2011, the Lexington Film League created an annual festival, the Harry Dean Stanton Fest, to honor Stanton in the city where he spent much of his adolescence. In 2012, he had a brief cameo in The Avengers and a key role in the action-comedy Seven Psychopaths. He also appeared in the Arnold Schwarzenegger action film The Last Stand (2013). Stanton was the subject of a 2013 documentary, Harry Dean Stanton: Partly Fiction, directed by Sophie Huber and featuring film clips, interviews with collaborators (including Wenders, Shepard, Kris Kristofferson, and David Lynch), and Stanton's singing.

In 2017, he appeared in Twin Peaks: The Return, a continuation of David Lynch's 1990–91 television series. Stanton reprised his role as Carl Rodd from Twin Peaks: Fire Walk with Me. His last on-screen appearances are as a sheriff in Frank & Ava and a starring role as a 90-year-old man nicknamed "Lucky" and his struggles against encroaching old age in Lucky.

Death
Stanton died aged 91 on September 15, 2017, at the Cedars-Sinai Medical Center in Los Angeles, California. His cremated remains were scattered in a cemetery in Nicholasville, Kentucky.

In popular culture
Stanton was celebrated in "I Want That Man", a 1989 song recorded by Deborah Harry which begins with the line "I want to dance with Harry Dean". In her memoir, Harry writes that Stanton heard the song and arranged to meet her at a club in London. 

Pop Will Eat Itself released a track titled "Harry Dean Stanton" on their album The Looks or the Lifestyle?  His lead role in the film Paris, Texas, was memorialized in Hayes Carll's 2019 song "American Dream" with the lyrics, "like Harry Dean Stanton on a drive-in screen, a tumbleweed blowing through Paris, Texas, he fell down into the American dream."

Ian McNabb recorded the song "Harry Dean Stanton" on his album Utopian, released in January 2021.  McNabb noted the following about the track:  "I didn't know too much about him and didn't really want to because I knew I had to write a song using his name as the title, so I wrote these lyrics for and around him - I imagined what it must be like to be him - while dropping some of my own experiences into the narrative. I was lurking around Dylan's Blind Willie McTell and Lenny Bruce - I wanted that atmosphere. I've never claimed to be original."

Selected filmography

 Revolt at Fort Laramie (1957)
 Ride in the Whirlwind (1966)
 Cool Hand Luke (1967)
 Day of the Evil Gun (1968) 
 Kelly's Heroes (1970)
 Two-Lane Blacktop (1971)
 Dillinger (1973)
 Pat Garrett & Billy the Kid (1973)
 Where the Lilies Bloom (1974)
 The Godfather Part II (1974)
 Farewell My Lovely  (1975)
 The Missouri Breaks (1976)
 Straight Time (1978)
 Alien (1979)
 The Rose (1979)
 Wise Blood (1979)
 Escape from New York (1981)
 Christine (1983)
 Repo Man (1984)
 Paris, Texas (1984)
 Red Dawn (1984)
 One Magic Christmas (1985)
 Pretty in Pink (1986)
 The Last Temptation of Christ (1988)
 Wild at Heart (1990)
 Twin Peaks: Fire Walk with Me (1992)
 Down Periscope (1996) 
 Fire Down Below (1997)
 Fear and Loathing in Las Vegas (1998)
 The Green Mile (1999)
 The Straight Story (1999)
 The Man Who Cried (2000)
 The Wendell Baker Story (2005)
 Alpha Dog (2006)
 Inland Empire (2006)
 Rango (2011)
 The Avengers (2012)
 The Last Stand (2013)
 Lucky (2017)

Selected television

Explanatory notes

References

External links

 
 
 
 
  (from NJ.com)

1926 births
2017 deaths
20th-century American male actors
21st-century American male actors
American male film actors
American male singers
American male television actors
American male voice actors
United States Navy personnel of World War II
Male actors from Kentucky
Military personnel from Kentucky
People from Irvine, Kentucky
Singers from Kentucky
United States Navy sailors
University of Kentucky alumni